Bebington (previously Higher Bebington and Woodhey, 1973 to 1979) is a Wirral Metropolitan Borough Council ward in the Wirral South Parliamentary constituency.

Councillors

References

Wards of Merseyside
Politics of the Metropolitan Borough of Wirral
Wards of the Metropolitan Borough of Wirral